Three Point Coal Camp was an unincorporated community in  Harlan County, Kentucky, United States. The Three Point Post Office is closed.

References

Unincorporated communities in Harlan County, Kentucky
Unincorporated communities in Kentucky
Coal towns in Kentucky